The 1953 Rice Owls football team represented Rice University as a member of the Southwest Conference (SWC) during the 1953 college football season. Led by 14th-year head coach Jess Neely, the Owls compiled an overall record of 9–2 with a mark of 5–1 in conference play, sharing the SWC title with Texas. Rice was ranked No. 6 in the final polls, which were conducted before bowl season. The Owls were invited to the 1954 Cotton Bowl Classic, played on New Years' Day, where they defeated Southeastern Conference (SEC)  champion, Alabama. The team played home games at Rice Stadium in Houston.

Schedule

References

Rice
Rice Owls football seasons
Southwest Conference football champion seasons
Cotton Bowl Classic champion seasons
Rice Owls football